This list of members of the United States Congress by longevity of service includes representatives and senators who have served for at least 36 years, in the House, the Senate, or both combined. In cases where there is a tie in time, the following criteria will sort people higher:
Achieved time uninterrupted (for total tenure ranks)
Achieved time first
Senators over representatives (for House and Senate lists)
Senate and House seniority

Key

Combined U.S. House and Senate time

Senate time
The 90th Congress was notable because for a period of 10 days (December 24, 1968 – January 3, 1969), it contained within the Senate, all 10 of what was at one point the top 10 longest-serving senators in history (Byrd, Inouye, Thurmond, Kennedy, Hayden, Stennis, Stevens, Hollings, Russell Jr., and Long) until January 7, 2013, when Patrick Leahy surpassed Russell B. Long as the 10th longest-serving senator in history. This period stretched from the appointment of Ted Stevens of Alaska to fill a vacancy to the retirement of Carl Hayden of Arizona early the next year. The 107th Congress (2001-2003) was the most recent one that contained all of the current top 7 longest serving senators in history (Byrd, Inouye, Leahy, Thurmond, Kennedy, Grassley and Hatch).

The 99th Congress (1985–1987) and 100th Congress (1987–1989) were the periods in which most people from this list were serving together (all but Hayden, Russell Jr., Warren, Eastland, Magnuson, and Shelby in the former and all but Hayden, Russell Jr., Long, Warren, Eastland, and Magnuson in the latter).

House time

See also
List of members of the United States Congress by brevity of service
List of historical longest-serving members of the United States Congress

References
Members Who Have Served in the U.S. Congress 30 Years or More (as of 2006)

Longevity
Senior legislators
United States Congress